Akira Kinoshita may refer to the following:

 Akira Kinoshita (photographer)
 Akira Kinoshita (shogi)